Glenn Lovett (born 23 July 1969) is a former Australian rules footballer who played for Melbourne in the VFL/AFL.

Lovett made his debut for Melbourne in 1987 but only managed seven games in his first three seasons. He did not cement his spot in the side until the 1990s. In 1992 he won the Keith 'Bluey' Truscott Medal for being Melbourne's best and fairest player and was runner up in 1993.

Lovett played only one game in the 1998 season battling hamstring injuries. Although he was named as vice-captain for 1999, he retired midway through the season.

Upon the end of his playing career, Lovett completed an MBA and began a successful career in sports business. He currently holds the position of President, Global Strategy, at REPUCOM, one of the world's leading sports marketing research companies.

Playing statistics

|- style="background-color: #EAEAEA"
! scope="row" style="text-align:center" | 1987
|style="text-align:center;"|
| 51 || 2 || 1 || 1 || 8 || 5 || 13 || 2 || 3 || 0.5 || 0.5 || 4.0 || 2.5 || 6.5 || 1.0 || 1.5
|-
! scope="row" style="text-align:center" | 1988
|style="text-align:center;"|
| 6 || 0 || — || — || — || — || — || — || — || — || — || — || — || — || — || — 
|- style="background:#eaeaea;"
! scope="row" style="text-align:center" | 1989
|style="text-align:center;"|
| 6 || 5 || 0 || 2 || 40 || 8 || 48 || 7 || 5 || 0.0 || 0.4 || 8.0 || 1.6 || 9.6 || 1.4 || 1.0
|-
! scope="row" style="text-align:center" | 1990
|style="text-align:center;"|
| 6 || 10 || 3 || 5 || 97 || 19 || 116 || 31 || 15 || 0.3 || 0.5 || 9.7 || 1.9 || 11.6 || 3.1 || 1.5
|- style="background:#eaeaea;"
! scope="row" style="text-align:center" | 1991
|style="text-align:center;"|
| 6 || 12 || 7 || 7 || 183 || 65 || 248 || 48 || 26 || 0.6 || 0.6 || 15.3 || 5.4 || 20.7 || 4.0 || 2.2
|-
! scope="row" style="text-align:center" | 1992
|style="text-align:center;"|
| 6 || 18 || 12 || 7 || 307 || 130 || 437 || 108 || 34 || 0.7 || 0.4 || 17.1 || 7.2 || 24.3 || 6.0 || 1.9
|- style="background:#eaeaea;"
! scope="row" style="text-align:center" | 1993
|style="text-align:center;"|
| 6 || 20 || 19 || 17 || 329 || 179 || 508 || 98 || 27 || 1.0 || 0.9 || 16.5 || 9.0 || 25.4 || 4.9 || 1.4
|-
! scope="row" style="text-align:center" | 1994
|style="text-align:center;"|
| 6 || 11 || 11 || 7 || 133 || 92 || 225 || 39 || 17 || 1.0 || 0.6 || 12.1 || 8.4 || 20.5 || 3.5 || 1.5
|-style="background:#eaeaea;"
! scope="row" style="text-align:center" | 1995
|style="text-align:center;"|
| 6 || 18 || 13 || 11 || 237 || 132 || 369 || 73 || 30 || 0.7 || 0.6 || 13.2 || 7.3 || 20.5 || 4.1 || 1.7
|-
! scope="row" style="text-align:center" | 1996
|style="text-align:center;"|
| 6 || 15 || 4 || 9 || 185 || 126 || 311 || 54 || 28 || 0.3 || 0.6 || 12.3 || 8.4 || 20.7 || 3.6 || 1.9
|-style="background:#eaeaea;"
! scope="row" style="text-align:center" | 1997
|style="text-align:center;"|
| 6 || 14 || 3 || 3 || 129 || 127 || 256 || 37 || 19 || 0.2 || 0.2 || 9.2 || 9.1 || 18.3 || 2.6 || 1.4
|-
! scope="row" style="text-align:center" | 1998
|style="text-align:center;"|
| 6 || 1 || 0 || 0 || 3 || 4 || 7 || 2 || 0 || 0.0 || 0.0 || 3.0 || 4.0 || 7.0 || 2.0 || 0.0
|-style="background:#eaeaea;"
! scope="row" style="text-align:center" | 1999
|style="text-align:center;"|
| 6 || 1 || 1 || 0 || 11 || 4 || 15 || 3 || 0 || 1.0 || 0.0 || 11.0 || 4.0 || 15.0 || 3.0 || 0.0
|- class="sortbottom"
! colspan=3| Career
! 127
! 74
! 69
! 1662
! 891
! 2553
! 502
! 204
! 0.6
! 0.5
! 13.1
! 7.0
! 20.1
! 4.0
! 1.6
|}

References

External links 
 
 Demon Wiki profile

1969 births
Australian rules footballers from Victoria (Australia)
Keith 'Bluey' Truscott Trophy winners
Living people
Melbourne Football Club players
People educated at Melbourne High School
Victorian State of Origin players